Félix Baumaine, full name Félix Gratien Baumaine, (4 December 1828 – 3 January 1881) was a 19th-century French playwright, composer and chansonnier.

The son of Joseph Baumaine, director of the shows in the city of Reims, Felix Baumaine is known for his collaboration with Charles Blondelet with whom he composed many songs played especially in cafés-concerts. He was thus himself the author of 1300 songs. During the last years of his life, Félix Baumaine was administrator of the café-concert des Ambassadeurs. He was the father of actress Juliette Baumaine.

Works 
1868: Le beau Paris, in collaboration with Charles Blondelet, saynete-bouffe set in music by Léon Roques; Egrot
1879: L'assommoir procédé d'une conférence sur l'Assommoir, ambiguë parodie in one act in collaboration with Charles Blondelet; Le Bailly

References 

French lyricists
French chansonniers
1828 births
Writers from Reims
1881 deaths
Musicians from Reims